James Francis McNulty Jr. (October 18, 1925 – June 30, 2009) was a one-term congressman and U.S. politician hailing from the Democratic party. He served as the U.S. representative from Arizona's 5th congressional district.

He was born in Boston, Massachusetts and attended college at the University of Arizona where he was a member of Phi Delta Theta fraternity. He served in the Arizona State Senate from 1969 to 1975. He defeated State Senator Jim Kolbe by around 1600 votes when the 5th District was created. However, two years later, Kolbe unseated McNulty in a rematch, largely due to the district running about 60 percent for President Ronald Reagan.

McNulty resided in Tucson, Arizona with his wife Jacqui until his death on June 30, 2009.  He had retired from law practice in 2000.

References

External links

Politicians from Boston
Politicians from Tucson, Arizona
University of Arizona alumni
Democratic Party Arizona state senators
Arizona lawyers
United States Army personnel of World War II
1925 births
2009 deaths
Neurological disease deaths in Arizona
Deaths from Parkinson's disease
Democratic Party members of the United States House of Representatives from Arizona
20th-century American politicians
Lawyers from Tucson, Arizona
20th-century American lawyers